When We Were Young is an annual music festival currently held at the Las Vegas Festival Grounds in Winchester. The most recent event took place on October 23 and 29, 2022.

History 
The first incarnation of the festival took place at The Observatory in Santa Ana, California on April 8 and 9, 2017.

In 2022, the festival was moved to Winchester, Nevada at the Las Vegas Festival Grounds. The event was first announced on January 18, 2022, as a one-day event on October 22, 2022. Tickets sold out quickly, leading to the addition of second and third dates on October 23 and 29, 2022. Matt Skiba of Alkaline Trio asserts that the festival lineup was announced before bands were committed, but that all bands would agree to play.

The first day was canceled due to weather. The band Car Seat Headrest was scheduled to play as part of the 2022 lineup but pulled out due to health issues.

On October 11, 2022, the festival announced it was returning for a second year in 2023 with Blink-182 and Green Day as headliners.

Lineups

2017 
The official festival lineup in alphabetical order; headliners in bold: 

 AFI
 Agent Orange
 Alkaline Trio
 Balance and Composure
 Beach Fossils
 The Buttertones
 Cage the Elephant
 Cat Signs
 CH3
 Choking Victim
 David Bazan
 Descendents
 The Dickies
 Dr. Dog
 Fidlar
 Foxygen
 The Frights
 The Get Up Kids
 Guttermouth
 Homeshake
 Joyce Manor
 Mike Watt
 Mount Eerie
 Morrissey
 Moving Units
 No Parents
 Pinback
 Plague Vendor
 The Regrettes
 Sadgirl
 Saves the Day
 Senses Fail
 Set Your Goals
 Sheer Mag
 Silversun Pickups
 The Stitches
 Streetlight Manifesto
 Sunflower Bean
 Taking Back Sunday
 Tijuana Panthers
 Together Pangea
 Turnstile

2022 
The official festival lineup in alphabetical order; headliners in bold:

 3OH!3
 Acceptance
 AFI
 Alex G (weekend 2 only)
 Alkaline Trio
 The All-American Rejects
 Anberlin
 Armor for Sleep
 Atreyu
 Avril Lavigne (weekend 1 only)
 Bayside
 Black Veil Brides
 Boys Like Girls
 Bright Eyes
 Bring Me the Horizon
 Dance Gavin Dance
 Dashboard Confessional
 A Day to Remember
 Death Cab for Cutie (weekend 2 only)
 Four Year Strong
 The Garden
 Glassjaw
 Hawthorne Heights
 HorrorPops
 Lil Huddy
 I Prevail
 Ice Nine Kills
 Jimmy Eat World
 Jxdn
 Kittie
 Knocked Loose
 La Dispute (weekend 1 only)
 The Linda Lindas
 The Maine
 Manchester Orchestra
 Mayday Parade
 Meet Me @ the Altar
 Millionaires 
 Mom Jeans
 Motionless in White
 My Chemical Romance
 Neck Deep
 Nessa Barrett
 Paramore
 Palaye Royale
 Prentiss
 Pierce the Veil
 Poppy
 Pvris
 The Ready Set
 The Red Jumpsuit Apparatus 
 Royal & the Serpent
 Saosin
 Senses Fail
 Silverstein
 Sleeping With Sirens
 The Starting Line
 State Champs
 Story of the Year
 The Story So Far
 Taking Back Sunday
 Thursday
 TV Girl
 Underoath (weekend 2 only)
 We the Kings
 Wolf Alice (weekend 1 only)
 The Wonder Years
 The Used

2023 
The official festival lineup in alphabetical order; headliners in bold:

 5 Seconds of Summer
 The Academy Is...
 AJJ
 All Time Low
 The Ataris
 Beach Bunny
 Blink-182
 Bowling for Soup
 Citizen
 Ekkstacy
 Fenix TX
 Finch
 The Front Bottoms
 Games We Play
 Goldfinger
 Good Charlotte
 Green Day
 Gym Class Heroes
 Hot Mulligan
 Jean Dawson
 Joyce Manor
 KennyHoopla
 Knuckle Puck
 Less Than Jake
 Lit
 Magnolia Park
 Michelle Branch
 Motion City Soundtrack
 Movements
 The Movielife
 MxPx
 New Found Glory
 No Pressure
 The Offspring
 Pierce the Veil
 Plain White T's
 Relient K
 Rise Against
 Saves The Day
 Say Anything
 Set It Off
 Simple Plan
 Something Corporate
 Sum 41
 Thirty Seconds to Mars
 Thrice
 Tigers Jaw
 Turnover
 The Veronicas
 Waterparks
 The Wrecks
 Yellowcard
 Zebrahead

See also 
 Slam Dunk Festival
 Taste of Chaos
 Vans Warped Tour

References

External links
 

2022 music festivals
2022 in Nevada
Events in Las Vegas
Music festivals in Nevada